Obtectodiscus is a genus of fungi in the family Dermateaceae. The genus contains two species.

See also
List of Dermateaceae genera

References

Dermateaceae genera
Dermateaceae